LinDVD from Corel was a commercial proprietary software for Linux for the playback of DVDs and other multimedia files. The latest version supported ultra-mobile PCs (UMPCs) and mobile internet devices (MIDs), as well as a streaming media and a wider range of standard and high-definition video and audio encoding standards.

LinDVD can play copy protected (CSS) DVDs. Certain distributions like Mandriva have included this software in their commercial Linux distributions, and Dell is now preinstalling it on their Ubuntu systems.

Corel removed all information about LinDVD from their webpage, that is, LinDVD is not supported anymore.

See also
 Comparison of media players
 WinDVD
 PowerDVD
 VLC media player

References

External links
 LinDVD on wiki.ubuntuusers.de (German)
 InterVideo LinDVD 

Software DVD players
Corel software
Linux DVD players